Oshya is a rural locality (a selo) and the administrative center of Oshyinskoye Rural Settlement, Kuyedinsky District, Perm Krai, Russia. The population was 820 as of 2010. There are 14 streets.

Geography 
Oshya is located 52 km northwest of Kuyeda (the district's administrative centre) by road. Verkhnyaya Oshya and Uzyar are the nearest rural localities.

References 

Rural localities in Kuyedinsky District